Storbeck is a surname. Notable people with the surname include:

Chad Michael Storbeck (born 1971), American drag queen also known as Chad Michaels
Fred Storbeck (1889–1970), South African Boer blacksmith and heavyweight boxer
Jürgen Storbeck (born 1946), German law enforcement officer

See also
 Starbeck